Hiroki Ito may refer to:

, Japanese footballer
, Japanese footballer
 (born 1999), Japanese diver
Hiroki Ito (volleyball), player for the 2022 Japan men's national volleyball team